State Route 9 (SR 9) is a rural and mountainous state highway in the U.S. state of California that travels  from SR 1 in Santa Cruz to SR 17 in Los Gatos, passing through the San Lorenzo Valley and the Saratoga Gap in the Santa Cruz Mountains.

Route description
SR 9 begins in the city of Santa Cruz where River Street intersects with SR 1. It heads north, paralleling the San Lorenzo River. The road is a winding two-lane road for the majority of its length until it approaches Fruitvale Avenue in Saratoga. SR 9 winds through the mountains north of Santa Cruz, passing through the communities of Paradise Park, Felton, Ben Lomond, Brookdale, and Boulder Creek, where State Route 236 departs from SR 9 to provide access to Big Basin Redwoods State Park. SR 236 later rejoins SR 9 near Castle Rock State Park.

At the summit of the Santa Cruz mountains (the junction with SR 35 and after a steep climb), there is a vista point offering a (somewhat obstructed) view of the Bay Area. At this junction, SR 9 passes into Santa Clara County.

SR 9 descends from the mountains heading east into Saratoga as Congress Springs Road. In Saratoga, SR 9 turns southeast and becomes Saratoga-Los Gatos Road. At Fruitvale Avenue in Saratoga, SR 9 briefly becomes a four-lane highway with a large center divider. However, as the road enters Monte Sereno, it again becomes a two-lane road. This particular narrowing has caused backups in the past; however, they have become more infrequent since the completion of SR 85. SR 9 resumes being a four-lane road through downtown Los Gatos until its terminus at the junction with SR 17 (a distance of about four city blocks).

Usage 
SR 9 is particularly popular for recreational motorcycling with motorcyclists from all over Northern California and beyond flocking to it at weekends. In summer months the short section between SR 35, Skyline Boulevard and SR 236, Big Basin Road becomes a popular destination for a variety of motorcycle types, and impromptu gatherings of riders in the parking lot at intersection of SR 35 and SR 9.

SR 9 is also popular with bicyclists. The  section from Saratoga Village to the Saratoga Gap is notable for the number of bicycles climbing the hill on weekend mornings. Since 1978, the highway between downtown Saratoga and downtown Los Gatos is the route for the popular "Great Race," when over 1,000 participants run between the two towns near the end of April.

Classification 
A small portion of SR 9 towards the northern terminus is part of the National Highway System, a network of highways that are considered essential to the country's economy, defense, and mobility by the Federal Highway Administration. SR 9 is eligible to be included in the State Scenic Highway System, and, between the Los Gatos town limit and the intersection with SR 35, is officially a scenic highway, meaning that it is a substantial section of highway passing through a "memorable landscape" with no "visual intrusions", where the potential designation has gained popular favor with the community.

History
SR 9 was created from several previously constructed roads. One of these was a toll road built in 1848 by Martin McCarty.

In 1913, the road from Saratoga Gap southwest to Big Basin Redwoods State Park via the present SR 9 and SR 236 was added to the state highway system; it became Route 42 (an unsigned designation) in 1917. Although this highway connected to Route 44, the remainder of present SR 236, the only connection to the continuous state highway system was with the Skyline Boulevard (Route 55, now SR 35) at Saratoga Gap. This changed in 1933, when Route 42 was extended east from the gap to Route 5 (SR 17) in Los Gatos, and a new Route 116 was created, running south from Route 42 at Waterman Gap (about halfway between Saratoga Gap and the park) to Santa Cruz, intersecting the end of Route 44 at Boulder Creek.

Sign Route 9 was marked in 1934; however, it did not entirely follow the present SR 9. Initially it connected Santa Cruz with Milpitas, following Routes 116 and 42 to Saratoga, Route 114 (Saratoga Sunnyvale Road and Mathilda Avenue) north through Sunnyvale, and Route 113 (SR 237) east to Route 5 (Main Street, then U.S. Route 101E and Sign Route 13) in Milpitas. When the San Jose-Oakland US 101E designation was dropped in the mid-1930s, Route 5 between Mission San Jose (where the new SR 21 turned northeast) and Hayward did not retain a signed designation. Later SR 9 was extended north along SR 17 (which had replaced SR 13) from Milpitas to Warm Springs, SR 21 to Mission San Jose, and the independent section of former US 101E—all part of Route 5—to US 50 (also Route 5, which included a branch to Oakland) near Hayward. Except for a short realignment in the mid-1950s onto Route 69 (now I-880 and SR 262) between Milpitas and Warm Springs, this alignment remained until the 1964 renumbering.

In 1964, SR 9 was moved to its present alignment, taking over the previously unsigned Route 42 from Saratoga to Los Gatos. The route that had been signed as SR 9 became SR 85 through Sunnyvale, SR 237 to Milpitas (including previously unsigned extensions of Route 113 at each end), part of SR 17 through Warm Springs, SR 262 through Warm Springs, part of I-680 to Mission San Jose, and SR 238 from Mission San Jose to Hayward (SR 21 was already renumbered I-680 by then). SR 85's original designation was deleted in 1994 and has since moved to a freeway and SR 17 in Warm Springs was renumbered I-880 a decade prior. However, the SR 237 freeway was built in the same location, and both SR 238 and most of SR 262 remain as surface roads.

Major intersections

See also

References

External links

California @ AARoads.com – State Route 9
Caltrans: Route 9 highway conditions
California Highways: Route 9

009
State Route 009
State Route 009
State Route 009
009
Santa Cruz, California
Saratoga, California
Los Gatos, California